PowerReviews is a technology company that provides software to brands and retailers that allow them to collect, display and analyse different forms of user-generated content (UGC) on their e-commerce websites.

The company's capabilities include product ratings and reviews, questions and answers (Q&A), product sampling, images, videos, and social content, and different analytics tools to examine the impact of user-generated content and benchmark product performance.

The company is headquartered in Chicago with an office in London servicing the EMEA market.

History

PowerReviews was founded in 2005. Bazaarvoice, a competitor, bought PowerReviews in 2012. The acquisition was opposed by the United States Department of Justice for antitrust concerns, focused on the ratings and review industry's relatively small marketplace and the potential importance to adjacent industries.

In 2014, consumer reviews company Viewpoints purchased PowerReviews from Bazaarvoice. The two companies combined under the PowerReviews name.

PowerReviews subsequently acquired BzzAgent from dunnhumby in July 2018 and Stella Pulse from StellaService in July 2019.

References

External links 
 

Companies established in 2005
Companies based in Chicago